Cadaujac is a commune in the Gironde department in Nouvelle-Aquitaine in southwestern France. Cadaujac station has rail connections to Langon and Bordeaux.

Population

International relations
Twinned with Tramore, County Waterford, Ireland

See also
Communes of the Gironde department

References

Communes of Gironde